Poland participated in the Eurovision Song Contest 1994. The Polish broadcaster Telewizja Polska (TVP) selected country's entry via an internal selection. Edyta Bartosiewicz was initially selected to represent Poland, however, she refused the broadcaster's offer and Edyta Górniak was ultimately selected to represent Poland at the 1994 contest in Dublin, Ireland with the song "To nie ja!" written by Jacek Cygan and Stanisław Syrewicz. Gorniak and her contest entry were announced on 16 April 1994.

Poland competed in the Eurovision Song Contest which took place on 30 April 1994. Performing during the show in position 24, Poland placed second out of the 25 participating countries, scoring 166 points. This marked the country's best result in the contest so far.

Background 
The Polish national broadcaster, TVP, planned to participate in the Eurovision Song Contest for the first time in 1993, however, the broadcaster later withdrew their application for unknown reasons. In 1994, Poland, ultimately, debuted at the contest. TVP organised the selection process for the nation's entry in addition to broadcasting further events within the nation. The broadcaster selected their debut entry in 1994 through the internal selection.

Before Eurovision

Internal selection 
The Polish entry for the 1994 Eurovision Song Contest was selected via an internal selection by broadcaster TVP. On 16 April 1994, it was announced that Edyta Górniak would represent Poland in the Eurovision Song Contest 1994 with the song "To nie ja!". The song was presented to the public on the same day. Prior to the Gorniak's selection as the Polish representative, singer Edyta Bartosiewicz was initially selected to represent Poland, however, she refused the broadcaster's offer due to the fact that "Eurovision does not fit into her artistic aesthetics". After Bartosiewicz's refusal, the broadcaster chose singer Edyta Górniak as a representative of Poland. Górniak was taken by surprise with the broadcaster asking her to represent her country at Eurovision, later revealing she originally ended a phonecall with a TVP representative thinking the offer was "a joke".

After Górniak was chosen to become the representative of Poland, the broadcaster offered her a song written by Włodzimierz Korcz and Wojciech Młynarski, however, she refused to perform the proposed song because, in her opinion, "this song did not meet the criteria of the competition", after which Edyta and her then manager Wiktor Kubiak found a demo version of the song "To nie ja!" (originally titled "Płonąca marionetka", meaning burning marionette, referring to the winning song of the Eurovision Song Contest 1965). Even though Edyta originally didn't like the demo, describing it as "kitsch" and "bad sounding", she eventually recorded it and offered it to the broadcaster instead of the originally proposed one. TVP still insisted on performing of the originally proposed song, but after Górniak had said she would either represent Poland with "To nie ja!" or not participate at all, the broadcaster ultimately allowed Edyta to perform the song at Eurovision.

At Eurovision

The Eurovision Song Contest 1994 took place at the Point Theatre in Dublin, Ireland, on 30 April 1994. According to the Eurovision rules, the 25-country participant list for the contest was composed of: the winning country from the previous year's contest and host country Ireland, top placed 18 countries, other than the previous year's winner, from the previous year's contest and any eligible countries who didn't participate in 1993 contest. Poland was one of the eligible countries who didn't participate in 1993 contest, and thus were permitted to participate. Poland performed 24th at the 1994 contest, following Russia and preceding France. Eurovision Song Contest 1994 was televised in Poland on TVP with the commentary by Artur Orzech.

The Polish performance featured Gorniak on stage wearing a short white dress and flat-heeled shoes. During the performance, Edyta was joined by three backing vocalists: Alicia Borkovska, Pauline Bolger and Robin Grant. After the voting concluded, Poland scored 166 points, including 5 sets of highest score of 12 points, from Austria, Estonia, France, Lithuania and United Kingdom; and placed 2nd. This is, as of 2022, Poland's best placing in its competitive history, and the nation's first and only finish in top 5.

Language controversy 
There was no free-language rule in operation at the time, and the furor erupted at the dress rehearsal when Górniak sung the second half of "To nie ja!" in English. According to Edyta, the reason for this decision was health problems, namely a cold as a result of hypothermia and the belief that it is easier to sing in English than in Polish. After the decision to sing in English at the rehearsal, six delegations ultimately raised their objections and formally petitioned for Poland to be disqualified, however Eurovision rules required a majority of delegations (13 in this case) to complain before the European Broadcasting Union could examine the case for disqualification, so Poland was allowed to remain.

Voting 
The same voting system in use since 1975 was again implemented for 1994 contest, with each country providing 1–8, 10 and 12 points to the ten highest-ranking songs as determined by a jury panel, with countries not allowed to vote for themselves. Poland assembled 16-member jury panel, headed by Janusz Kosiński and consisting of Irena Santor, Włodzimierz Korcz, Anna Maria Jopek, Tadeusz Woźniak, Maciej Chmiel, Szymon Majewski, Małgorzata Szniak, Marek Gaszyński, Marek Niedźwiecki, Tomasz Justyński, Anna Rutkowska, Jacek Olechowski, Agnieszka Gach, Ilona Skrętna, Maria Teodorowicz and Elżbieta Chełstowska, to determine which countries would receive their points. The Polish spokesperson, who announced the points awarded by the Polish jury during the final, was Jan Chojnacki. Below is a breakdown of points awarded to Poland and awarded by Poland in the contest. The Polish jury awarded its 12 points to Hungary.

After Eurovision 
After the final, two music videos were released, one for the English version entitled "Once in a Lifetime" and another for the Polish version. "To nie ja" starts with Górniak singing on a dark stage surrounded by smoke and blue light. Inserts of her singing in the recording studio occur throughout the video. For "Once in a Lifetime", Górniak wears yellow clothes in front of a white background, while the camera shows her from different perspectives. After the participation in the Eurovision Song Contest, Górniak was invited to perform the song in the two biggest music festivals in Poland: the National Festival of Polish Song in Opole and the Sopot Festival. The song was certified gold in Poland in 1999. In 2015 it was declared the best Polish hit of the '90s by the viewers of the TV channel Kino Polska Muzyka.

After the final of the contest, Israeli singer Joni Nameri accused the author of the song "To nie ja!" Stanislav Sirevich of plagiarizing his song "A Man in Love", released in 1987. Sirevich responded to the accusations, explaining that he composed the melody of "To nie ja" three years earlier than Nameri, in 1984.

See also
Poland in the Eurovision Song Contest
Eurovision Song Contest 1994

References

Bibliography 
 

1994
Countries in the Eurovision Song Contest 1994